The following is an episode list for the MOJO HD game show I Bet You. I Bet You is a buddy show about the lives of best friends and professional poker players Phil "The Unabomber" Laak and Antonio "The Magician" Esfandiari as they wander the streets of America betting and daring each other on anything and everything that inspires them, using their own money. The first season aired in 2007 and the second season wrapped up on July 10, 2008.

Series overview

Episodes
Key
 In the # column:
 The first number refers to the order it aired during the entire series.
 The second number refers to the episode number within its season: i.e. 1506 would be the sixth episode of the fifteenth season.

Season 1 (2007)

Season 2 (2008)

References

External links
 I Bet You episode list on the official website

Lists of American non-fiction television series episodes
Lists of reality television series episodes